The 1968 Canadian Grand Prix was a Formula One motor race held at the Circuit Mont-Tremblant in St. Jovite, Quebec, Canada on September 22, 1968. It was race 10 of 12 in both the 1968 World Championship of Drivers and the 1968 International Cup for Formula One Manufacturers. The 90-lap race was won by McLaren driver Denny Hulme after starting from sixth position. Hulme's teammate Bruce McLaren finished second and BRM driver Pedro Rodríguez came in third.

After the success of the 1967 Canadian Grand Prix, the event was given a place on the 1968 calendar, but was moved from Mosport Park to the Circuit Mont-Tremblant. Attention centred on the battle for the Drivers' Championship, with Graham Hill leading on 30 points, closely followed by Jacky Ickx on 27, Jackie Stewart on 26 and defending champion Denny Hulme on 24.

Report

Entry
A total of 22 cars were entered for this event, the first of three races in the Americas.

Dan Gurney was present in a third Bruce McLaren Motor Racing prepared McLaren M7A, although entered by his Anglo American Racers team, having given up on his Eagle-Weslake project. Despite this, there was an Eagle T1F in Quebec, in the hands of local Formula A/5000 driver, Al Pease. Another local driver from this series, Bill Brack, appeared in Team Lotus's third car. Meanwhile, BRM ran only one car for Pedro Rodríguez. Matra Sports expanded their operation to two cars, with Henri Pescarolo joining Jean-Pierre Beltoise, while Johnny Servoz-Gavin drove a second car prepared by Matra International, following his second place at the previous race in Italy. Alongside Jackie Stewart, this made four Matras in the field.

Qualifying
With his Repco engine finally beginning to work, Jochen Rindt secured pole position for the Brabham Racing Organisation in their Brabham-Repco BT26, with an average speed of 101.711 mph. He was joined on the front row by Chris Amon's Ferrari 312 and Jo Siffert in Rob Walker's Lotus 49B. The fastest McLaren was that of Dan Gurney, qualifying on the second row, alongside the works Lotus of Graham Hill, while the third row featured both of the Bruce McLaren Motor Racing entered McLaren M7As of Denny Hulme and Bruce McLaren, sandwiching the sole Honda RA301 of John Surtees.

During qualifying, Jacky Ickx's hopes of winning the World title ended when he crashed his Ferrari 312, after the throttle stuck open. As a result, Ickx suffered a broken leg.

Race
The race was held over 90 laps of the Circuit Mont-Tremblant, taking place in sunny conditions, with the Ferrari of Chris Amon leading straight from the off, with Jo Siffert chasing him. Then followed Jochen Rindt, Dan Gurney and Graham Hill. The positions at the front remained stable, with John Surtees retiring from eighth place with gearbox troubles. On lap 14, Hill managed pass Gurney, and 12 laps later, the American dropped away with a broken radiator. An oil leak accounted for Siffert, on lap 29, and so Rindt was second, although he too retired shortly afterwards with an engine failure. This promoted Hill to second. That too was short-lived, as he soon dropped behind the McLarens of Denny Hulme and Bruce McLaren because of a serious vibration issues. As Hill's Lotus 49B gradually fell back, he was overtaken by Pedro Rodríguez and Johnny Servoz-Gavin. A few laps later (lap 71), the Matra of Servoz-Gavin had spun out and Hill was back up to fifth.

While all this was going on, Amon seemed to have everything under control for the first 72 laps of the race, however, on the 73rd lap, his legendary bad luck struck when his Ferrari's transmission failed. This gave McLaren a 1-2 victory with Rodríguez grabbing third for BRM. Hulme won in a time of 2hr 27.11.2mins., averaging a speed of 97.799 mph, and was a full lap ahead of his team-mate.

The result put reigning World Champion Hulme level on points with Hill, with two races remaining.

Classification

Qualifying

Race

Championship standings after the race

Drivers' Championship standings

Constructors' Championship standings

Note: Only the top five positions are included for both sets of standings.

References

Canadian Grand Prix
Canadian Grand Prix
1968 in Canadian motorsport